Heinz Hoenig (born 24 September 1951) is a German actor who participated in over 100 feature films and TV productions.

Filmography 
{|width="100%"
|valign="top" width="50%"|
 1975: Under the Pavement Lies the Strand (directed by Helma Sanders-Brahms)
 1976: Direktion City (TV series)
 1976:  (directed by Helma Sanders-Brahms)
 1977: Pfarrer in Kreuzberg (TV series, directed by )
 1978: Knife in the Head (directed by Reinhard Hauff)
 1978: Mord am Lietzensee (TV film, directed by )
 1978: Paul kommt zurück (TV film, directed by )
 1978: Bares Geld (TV film, directed by Horst Schwaab)
 1979:  (TV film, directed by )
 1979:  (directed by )
 1980: Tatort: Der Zeuge (TV series, directed by Peter Adam)
 1980: SOKO 5113: Rosis Brüder (TV series, directed by )
 1981: Das Boot (directed by Wolfgang Petersen)
 1981:  (directed by )
 1982:  (directed by )
 1982: Mit starrem Blick aufs Geld (directed by )
 1982: Es muß nicht immer Mord sein: Eine Nummer zu groß (TV series, directed by Werner Gronwald)
 1982: Die Barrikade (TV film, directed by )
 1982: Mamma (directed by Suzanne Osten)
 1983: Danni (directed by )
 1983: Krimistunde (TV series, directed by )
 1983: Die leichten Zeiten sind vorbei (directed by Ulli Weiss)
 1983: Angst vor dem Leben (TV film, directed by Hagen Müller-Stahl)
 1985: Ami Go Home oder der Fragebogen (TV film, directed by Rolf Busch)
 1985:  (directed by )
 1986:  (directed by Michael Verhoeven)
 1986:  (TV film, directed by Uwe Frießner)
 1986: Dann ist nichts mehr wie vorher (TV film, directed by Gerd Roman Frosch)
 1988: Stadtromanzen (TV film, directed by Dagmar Brendecke)
 1988: Judgment in Berlin (directed by Leo Penn)
 1988:  (directed by )
 1988: Eurocops: Der Schwur (TV series, directed by Bernhard Fischerauer)
 1988: The Cat (directed by Dominik Graf)
 1988: Der Fahnder: Der kleine Bruder (TV series, directed by Dominik Graf)
 1989: The Voice (directed by )
 1989: Bread and Butter (directed by Gabriel Barylli)
 1989: Tiger, Lion, Panther (directed by Dominik Graf)
 1989: Reporter (TV series, directed by Klaus Emmerich)
 1989: Der Leibwächter (TV film, directed by Adolf Winkelmann)
 1990:  (directed by Reinhard Münster)
 1990:  (directed by Cyril Frankel)
 1990: Herzlich Willkommen (directed by Hark Bohm)
 1990: Ein Fall für zwei: Vaterliebe (TV series, directed by Michael Mackenroth)
 1990: Tatort: Rendezvous (TV series, directed by Martin Gies)
 1990: Abenteuer Airport (TV series, directed by Werner Masten)
 1991: Der Castillo Coup (TV film, directed by )
 1991: Tatort: Blutwurstwalzer (TV series, directed by Wolfgang Becker)
 1991: Der Goldene Schnitt (TV film, directed by )
 1992: Unser Lehrer Doktor Specht (TV series)
 1992: Ein Fall für Zwei: Scheine spielen Schwarz (TV series, directed by Michael Werlin)
 1992: Der Fahnder: Bis ans Ende der Nacht (TV series, directed by Dominik Graf)
 1992: Die Spur führt ins Verderben (TV film, directed by Wolf Gremm)
 1992:  (directed by )
 1993:  (TV miniseries, directed by Dieter Wedel
 1992: Frohes Fest, Lucie (TV film, directed by Roland Suso Richter)
 1992: Die Angst wird bleiben (TV film, directed by )
 1992: Die Männer vom K3: Ein langes Wochenende (TV series, directed by Horst Flick)
 1992:  (TV series, directed by Michael Verhoeven)
 1993: Einer zahlt immer (TV film, directed by Max Färberböck)
 1993: Wolffs Revier: Poker (TV series, directed by Michael Lähn)
 1993:  (TV series, directed by )
 1993: Cliffs of the Death (TV film, directed by Wolf Gremm)
 1993: Ich klage an (TV film, directed by Frank Guthke)
 1993: Tatort: Bauernopfer (TV series, directed by Vadim Glowna)
 1994:  (directed by Dominik Graf)
 1994: Lemgo (TV film, directed by )
 1994:  (TV series, episode Inkasso, directed by Ulrich Stark)
 1994: The Police Murderer (directed by Peter Keglevic)
 1995: Sylter Geschichten (TV series, directed by Karsten Wichniarz)
 1995: A.S.: Auf eigene Faust (TV series, directed by Frank Guthke)
 1995: Ex (TV film, directed by )
 1995: Countdown (Short film, directed by Marcel Kyrill Gardelli, Kamera: Jo an Mey)
 1995: Inka Connection (TV film, directed by Wolf Gremm)
 1996:  (TV miniseries, directed by Dieter Wedel)
 1996: Die Drei: Unschuldig (TV series, directed by Bernhard Stephan)
 1996:  (directed by Dennis Satin)
 1996: Die Nacht hat 17 Stunden (TV film, directed by Diethard Klante)
|valign="top" width="50%"|
 1996: Life Is a Bluff (directed by )
 1996: Die Männer vom K3: Eine saubere Stadt (TV series, directed by Helmut Förnbacher)
 1996: Der Ausbruch (TV film, directed by Mark Schlichter)
 1996:  (directed by Gabriel Barylli)
 1996: Sardsch (TV series, directed by Axel de Roche)
 1997: Verdammtes Glück (TV film, directed by Bernhard Stephan)
 1997: Konsalik Collection: Mayday – Flug in den Tod (TV film, directed by Chris Bould)
 1997: Für immer und immer (directed by Hark Bohm)
 1997:  (TV film, directed by )
 1997: Back in Trouble (directed by Andy Bausch)
 1997: Ein todsicheres Ding (TV film, directed by Diethard Klante)
 1998: Sylvia – Eine Klasse für sich (TV series, directed by )
 1998: : Auf eigene Faust (TV series, directed by Frank Guthke)
 1998: Kai Rabe gegen die Vatikankiller (directed by Thomas Jahn)
 1998: Tödliche Schatten (TV film, directed by Diethard Klante)
 1998: S.O.S. Barracuda (TV series, directed by Michel Bielawa)
 1998:  (TV miniseries, directed by Dieter Wedel)
 1998: Mein Kind muss leben (TV film, directed by Diethard Klante)
 1999: Zwei Asse und ein König (TV miniseries, directed by )
 1999: : Echte Freunde (TV series, directed by )
 1999: : Ein Mann, ein Wort (TV series, directed by Ralph Bohn)
 1999: Split Second (TV film, directed by )
 1999: King of Thieves (directed by Ivan Fíla)
 2000: Die zwei Leben meines Vaters (TV film, directed by Olaf Kreinsen)
 2000: Donna Leon: Death and Judgment (TV series, directed by Christian von Castelberg)
 2000: : Ohne Wenn und Aber (TV series, directed by Hartmut Griesmayr)
 2001: Deadly Rendezvous (TV film, directed by Wolf Gremm)
 2001: Liebe und Verrat (TV film, directed by Mark Schlichter)
 2001: Nicht ohne dich (TV film, directed by Diethard Klante)
 2002: Die Affäre Semmeling (TV miniseries, directed by Dieter Wedel)
 2002: Atlantic Affairs (TV film, directed by Hark Bohm)
 2002: Tatort: Reise ins nichts (TV series, directed by Hartmut Griesmayr)
 2003: Ein himmlischer Freund (TV film, directed by Karsten Wichniarz)
 2003: Vera, die Frau des Sizilianers (TV film, directed by Joseph Vilsmaier)
 2003–2004: Tabaluga und das verschenkte Glück (as Arktos, Live-Tour)
 2004: 7 Zwerge – Männer allein im Wald (directed by )
 2005:  (TV film, directed by Geriet Schieske)
 2005:  (TV film, directed by Heiner Lauterbach, Mark Keller)
 2005: Antikörper (directed by Christian Alvart)
 2006:  (directed by Ute Wieland)
 2006: Rose unter Dornen (TV film, directed by Dietmar Klein)
 2006: Papa und Mama (TV miniseries, directed by Dieter Wedel)
 2006: Der Arzt vom Wörthersee (TV series, directed by Karsten Wichniarz)
 2006: Die ProSieben Märchenstunde: Rotkäppchen – Wege zum Glück (TV series, directed by )
 2006: 7 Zwerge – Der Wald ist nicht genug (directed by Sven Unterwaldt)
 2007: Jump! The Phillipe Halsman Story (directed by Joshua Sinclair)
 2007: Der Arzt vom Wörthersee: Schatten im Paradies (TV series, directed by )
 2007: Schuld oder Unschuld (TV film, directed by Markus Rosenmüller)
 2007: Yo (directed by Rafael Cortes)
 2008: Das Traumschiff: Rio de Janeiro (TV series)
 2008: Der Arzt vom Wörthersee: Ein Wink des Himmel (TV series, directed by Peter Weissflog)
 2008: The Last Blast (directed by Sohm Offös)
 2009: Kopf oder Zahl (directed by Benjamin Eicher, Timo Joh. Mayer)
 2009:  (TV film, directed by )
 2009: Karren im Dreck (Short film, directed by Daniel Seideneder)
 2010:  (TV film, directed by Dieter Wedel)
 2010: Vater Morgana (directed by )
 2010: Willkommen in Wien (TV film, directed by )
 2011: Mord in bester Gesellschaft (TV series)
 2012:  (TV film, directed by Joseph Vilsmaier)
 2012:  (TV film, directed by Florian Gärtner)
 2012: Der letzte Bulle (TV series)
 2012:  (TV film, directed by Petra K. Wagner)
 2012: Tabaluga und die Zeichen der Zeit (as Arktos, Live-Tour)
 2012: Das Traumschiff: Puerto Rico (TV series)
 2013: Das Traumschiff: Malaysia (TV series)
 2019: The Masked Singer (TV series)
|}

 Accolades 
 1982:  category Nachwuchspreis 1992: Telestar for Die Angst wird bleiben 1993: Deutscher Filmpreis, category Beste darstellerische Leistungen for Krücke 1993: Goldener Gong for Einer zahlt immer 1996: Bayerischer Fernsehpreis for The Shadow Man 1997: Adolf-Grimme-Preis for The Shadow Man 1998: Goldene Kamera for The King of St. Pauli 1998: Bambi
 2002: Siegfried-Lowitz-Preis
 2005: Kinderlachen-Preis
 2005: Deutscher Comedypreis, category Beste Kino-Komödie Ehrenkommissarswürde Bayern

 Discography 
2001: Familienbande''

Further reading

External links 

 
 
 Heinz Hoenig at filmportal.de

1951 births
Living people
People from Landsberg am Lech
German male film actors
German male stage actors
German male television actors
20th-century German male actors
20th-century German people
21st-century German male actors
German Film Award winners